Nodozana catocaloides is a moth of the subfamily Arctiinae. It was described by Christian Gibeaux in 1983. It is found in French Guiana.

References

Lithosiini
Moths described in 1983